Nigeria is a country in West Africa.

Nigeria or Nigerian may also refer to:
Languages of Nigeria
Nigerian cuisine
Nigerian Pidgin
 45619 Nigeria, a British LMS Jubilee Class locomotive
  was a light cruiser of the Royal Navy completed early in World War II
 Nigeria (Grant Green album)
 Nigeria (Oluyemi Thomas album)

See also
Nigerian scam
Nigerian American
Nigerian Breweries
Nigerian Canadians

Niger (disambiguation)